Ortuseight is an Indonesian sport manufacturing company based in the Tangerang, Indonesia and it was established in 2018 which produces sports shoes and jerseys. Ortuseight's company name is PT. Vita Nova Atletik.

Name 
ORTUS is taken from the words "Optimism, Resilience, Trust, Upbeat, and Social". Ortus itself means sunrise, dawn, or beginning, and EIGHT is the number of teams that start a company.

Sponsorship 
Teams and athletes using Ortuseight equipment are:

Teams

Club teams 

  BJL 2000
  Cosmo Futsal
  Halus FC
  Jeck Kato 86
  MAS Young Rior
  Mutiara FC
  SKN FC Kebumen

National teams 

  Indonesia futsal team

Athletes

Futsal 

  Andri Kustiawan
  Ardi Dwi Suwardy
  Anzar
  Fachri Reza
  Samuel Eko
  Syahidansyah Lubis
  Muhammad Syaifullah
  Ramadhan Zidani
  Muhammad Rizky Xavier
  Muhammad Iksan Rahadian
  Hasriyanoor Hanafi
  Andrei Harmaji
  Efrinaldi
  Muhammad Afif Rizky
  Fhandy Pernama
  Caisar Octavianus Silitonga
  Krisna Bramenta
  Salim Hanafi Sungkar
  Tely Sarendra
  Bambang Bayu Saptaji
  Wahid Setiawan
  Muhammad Nizar
  Diego Menezes
  Khalid El Hattach
  Karim Mossaoui

Football 
Indonesia
  Athallah Arraihan
  Bayu Gatra
  Beckham Putra
  Fadil Sausu
  Gian Zola
  Rizky Dwi Febrianto
  Rizky Ridho
  Ryuji Utomo
  Salman Alfarid
  Sandi Sute
  Rasyid Bakri
  Hariono
  Henhen Herdiana
  Fahmi Al Ayyubi
  Muhammad Arfan
  Haudi Abdillah
  Saddam Gaffar
  Syafril Lestaluhu
Malaysia
  Faisal Halim

Pencak Silat 

  Puspa Arum Sari

References

External links 

Athletic shoe brands
Indonesian brands
Clothing companies established in 2018
Shoe brands
Sporting goods brands
Sportswear brands
Swimwear manufacturers
Indonesian companies established in 2018